Casa Felipó is a historical building in Andorra la Vella, Andorra. Built in 1948, it is located along the Avinguda de Meritxell, just to east of the Andorra National Library and the Església de Sant Esteve. It is a heritage property registered in the Cultural Heritage of Andorra.

References

Buildings and structures in Andorra la Vella
Houses in Andorra
Houses completed in 1948
Cultural Heritage of Andorra